Events from the year 1889 in Italy

Kingdom of Italy
Monarch – Umberto I (1878–1900)
Prime Minister – Francesco Crispi (1887–1891)

Events
 2 May – Signing of the Treaty of Wuchale.

Births

8 February – Amedeo Marchi, gymnast.
8 March – Alessandro Scarioni, footballer (died 1966).
8 November – Aldo Cevenini, footballer (died 1973).
 29 November – Eduardo Weber, engineer and businessman, creator of the Weber carburetor (died 1945).

Deaths
 18 October – Massimiliano Quilici, composer (born 1799).

References

 
1880s in Italy 
1889 in the Italian Empire
Years of the 19th century in Italy
Italy
Italy